St Maelog's Church is a church in the village of Llanfaelog, situated in the Isle of Anglesey, Wales. The present building dates from the 19th century. It was designated as a Grade II listed building on 4 May 1971.

History and architecture
The church is dedicated to Saint Maelog. There has been a church on the current site since the 6th century. The present church was erected in 1848 in the Gothic Revival style; the architect was Henry Kennedy of Bangor. It was designated as a Grade II listed building on 4 May 1971.

References

External links 
Artworks at St Maelog's Church, Llanfaelog

Grade II listed churches in Anglesey